Bijand (also Romanized as Bījand; also known as Bejand) is a village in Howmeh Rural District, in the Central District of Sarab County, East Azerbaijan Province, Iran. At the 2006 census, its population was 1,674, in 438 families.

References 

Populated places in Sarab County